West of the Water Tower is a 1923 American silent comedy drama film produced by Famous Players-Lasky and distributed by Paramount Pictures. It was directed by Rollin S. Sturgeon and is based on the novel of the same name by Homer Croy. Glenn Hunter and May McAvoy are the stars of this film.

Plot
As described in a film magazine review, Guy Plummer, the son of the small town's orthodox, narrow minded clergyman, becomes involved in a love affair with Bee Chew, the daughter of a wealthy atheist. They wed in secret through the aid of Cod Dugan, a poolroom operator. When Bee is about to become a mother, the two are unable to provide proof of the marriage. She goes away and later returns with the baby. Guy tells his father, who then admits that he, too, similarly sinned in his youth and decides to give up his pulpit. In the end, Guy wins back the favorable opinion of his neighbors, the existence of the marriage is proven, and the young couple find happiness.

Cast

Preservation
With no copies of West of the Water Tower located in any film archives, it is a lost film.

References

External links

Dust jacket cover to Croy's novel; with scene from film depicted
1923 theater showing West of the Water Tower
Australian long lobby poster; daybill
More accessible version of poster
Film still at the Harry Ransom Center

American silent feature films
Films based on American novels
Lost American films
1923 comedy-drama films
1920s English-language films
American black-and-white films
Paramount Pictures films
Films directed by Rollin S. Sturgeon
1923 lost films
Lost comedy-drama films
1923 films
1920s American films
Silent American comedy-drama films